Ahalanui is the name of an ahupuaʻa and was the Hawaiian name for a Hawaiʻi County-managed beach park in the district of Puna. During the 2018 lower Puna eruption the area was covered by lava.

References 

Geography of Hawaii (island)
Parks in Hawaii